The Kremlin Letter is a 1970 American neo-noir DeLuxe Color espionage thriller in Panavision  directed by John Huston and starring Richard Boone, Orson Welles, Max von Sydow, Bibi Andersson, Patrick O'Neal and George Sanders. It was released in February 1970 by 20th Century-Fox.

The screenplay was co-written by Huston and Gladys Hill as a faithful adaptation of the novel by Noel Behn, who had worked for the United States Army's Counterintelligence Corps. Said by reviewers to be "beautifully" and "engagingly" photographed, the film is a highly complex and amoral tale of bitter intrigue and espionage set in the winter of 1969–1970 at the height of the US-Soviet Cold War.

The Kremlin Letter was a commercial failure and thinly reviewed in 1970, but the film has gathered steady praise from some critics throughout the decades since its release. French filmmaker Jean-Pierre Melville called The Kremlin Letter "masterly" and "...saw it as establishing the standard for cinema."

Plot

Late in 1969, a brilliant young United States Navy intelligence officer, Charles Rone, finds his commission revoked so that he can be recruited into an espionage mission to retrieve a fake letter showing an alliance between the West and the Soviet Union against China. Rone is told that the mission is being undertaken independently of governmental intelligence agencies, as was commonplace prior to World War II, when espionage operations were handled by a small community of agents operating on a freelance basis.

Rone is told that the primary operator in that community, a "brutal, sadistic, conscienceless assassin" named Robert Sturdevant, did not adapt to the post-war shift to government intelligence agencies, along with the disbanding of the independent network of spies, with Sturdevant disappearing and reportedly later committing suicide. Now, the government has suffered a significant failure in an important intelligence operation and has turned back to the independent agents for help.

This time, "The Highwayman", another member of the old group of independent spies is the man leading the effort to reassemble the network to take on this mission. Another member of the group has recently died, and Rone has been tabbed as his replacement, due to Rone's exceptional analytical skills, eidetic memory and ability to speak eight languages with a native accent.

Rone meets with The Highwayman and another group member, Ward, the latter of whom takes on the role of Rone's primary tutor. They first task Rone with rounding up three other members of the group:  Janis, "The Whore", a drug dealer and panderer; "The Warlock", a culturally sophisticated homosexual; and "The Erector Set", a highly skilled thief and burglar.

Janis begs off of the mission, saying that he won't work for The Highwayman, but only for Sturdevant, whom he believes would never have killed himself.  Rone finally bribes him into agreeing to participate.  The Warlock joins the operation without hesitation, but The Erector Set's hands have become too arthritic to be of use. Instead, he sends his beautiful daughter, B.A., in his place, as he has trained her to be as capable as is he.

The group's mission is the retrieval of a letter, written without proper authorization, that promises United States aid to the Soviet Union in destroying Chinese atomic weapons plants.  The letter had been solicited on behalf of an unknown high-level Soviet official by Dmitri Polyakov, who had previously been selling Soviet secrets to the United States that he had obtained from that same Soviet official. Upon finding out about the letter, which was a de facto "declaration of war against China", U.S. and British authorities had contacted Polyakov and arranged to buy it back from him.  However, Polyakov then committed suicide after being apprehended by Soviet counter-intelligence, under the direction of Colonel Yakov Kosnov.

The group blackmails Captain Potkin, the Soviet head of counter-intelligence in the U.S., threatening his family to force him to allow them the use of his usually-vacant apartment in Moscow.  Once they arrive in the Soviet Union, the terminally ill Highwayman sacrifices his life, attempting to divert the attention of Soviet counter-intelligence away from the remainder of the team.  Rone is assigned to remain at the apartment with Ward and accept reports verbally from other team members, Rone's memory allowing them to avoid the use of written records.  Janis, The Warlock and B.A. then set out to establish themselves in various parts of Russian society as they try to ascertain the identity of Polyakov's contact.

Janis enters a partnership with a local brothel operator, who points him to a Chinese man known as "The Kitai" as a possible source for names of officials and others to whom he can sell heroin, with which Janis already plans to keep the prostitutes addicted. Janis later discerns that the Kitai is also a spy and further happens to spot Kosnov leaving a local night club with a woman whom he discovers was Polyakov's devoted wife, Erika Beck. She is now married to Kosnov, so B.A. plants a listening device in their bedroom.  After that, B.A. takes up with a local small-time thief and black market operator, though she finds herself terribly unhappy and wishes only to return home to her father.  In the meantime, the Warlock integrates himself into the local community of intellectual homosexuals, starting an affair with a university professor.  He then meets one of the professor's students who was Polyakov's former lover and who informs him that Polyakov had had a relationship with Vladimir Bresnavitch of the Soviet Central Committee.

Bresnavitch turns out to have an adversarial relationship with Kosnov, whose activities Bresnavitch oversees on behalf of the Committee. According to Kosnov, the animosity between the two men went back many years to when Bresnavitch sought to oust Kosnov from his job, in favor of Sturdevant. Prior to that time, Kosnov and Sturdevant had been friendly, with each one trusting the other to allow his agents to operate in the other's territory. However, with the pressure from Bresnavitch, Kosnov decided he had to do "something spectacular" to keep his job, so he betrayed Sturdevant's trust and captured his agents, employing a great deal of brutality and earning the lasting enmity of Sturdevant himself.

Upon deducing that Bresnavitch had used Polyakov to fence stolen art works in Paris, Ward decides to go there in search of any possible leads. On the day of his return, the group's mission is destroyed when Potkin returns to the Soviet Union and informs Bresnavitch about the operation. Janis, B.A. and Ward are apprehended, while The Warlock commits suicide just before capture and Rone narrowly escapes. Rone tries visiting the Kitai to arrange re-purchase of the letter, but the Kitai responds by trying to kill him and Rone determines that the Chinese have possession of the letter.

Rone then turns to Erika, with whom he has been having an affair while posing as a Russian gigolo named Yorgi.  He hopes to get her to inquire with her husband about the condition of those captured.  She informs him that Kosnov participated in no such capture, and Rone realizes that Bresnavitch quietly orchestrated the raid without the knowledge of Soviet counter-intelligence, a clear indicator that he was Polyakov's traitorous high-level Soviet official contact.  Rone's questions reveal to Erika his true identity and he promises to help her escape to the West.  She tells him she will try to ascertain the fates of the captured agents and later reports back that B.A. has taken poison and is expected to die, while one of the men is dead and the other has survived and is being held captive.

Rone threatens to expose Bresnavitch unless Ward, the surviving agent, is released.  Bresnavitch agrees, and Rone and Ward then arrange to leave the next day. Disapproving of Rone's plans to aid Erika, Ward lures her into a trap and kills her.  Kosnov believes that her lover Yorgi killed her and tracks down Rone, though unaware of Rone's true identity, in search of revenge. But Ward enters, leading Kosnov to observe that "I seem to know you."  Ward says that the two men have "a lot of old corpses to dig up and talk about."  He begins listing the names of the agents betrayed by Kosnov and says that the time has come for retribution, as he shoots Kosnov in the kneecap.  Kosnov stares at Ward in disbelief, saying "No, it isn't. It can't be."  Ward then closes on him off-camera and Kosnov begins screaming in torment.

As they head for a plane to leave the country, Rone shares with Ward his conclusions that Ward is in fact Sturdevant and intends to stay, having made a deal with Bresnavitch to take over as the head of Soviet counter-intelligence.  Ward denies it, but only coyly, and then reveals that B.A. is not dead.  He says that she will be held to ensure that Rone does not reveal the truth about him.  Rone, very much in love with B.A., vows that he'll get her back somehow.  Ward offers to release B.A. if Rone does "one last little thing", handing Rone an envelope as Rone boards the plane.  After seating himself, Rone opens the envelope to find a note which reads, "Kill Potkin's wife and daughters or I kill the girl."

Cast
 Patrick O'Neal as Charles Rone
 Richard Boone as Ward
 Max von Sydow as Colonel Kosnov
 Bibi Andersson as Erika Kosnov
 Barbara Parkins as B.A.
 George Sanders as "The Warlock"
 Nigel Green as "The Whore"
 Micheál MacLíammóir as "Sweet Alice"
 Orson Welles as Bresnavitch
 Ronald Radd as Captain Potkin
 Dean Jagger as "The Highwayman"
 Lila Kedrova as Sophie
 Raf Vallone as Puppet Maker
 Sandor Elès (credited as Sandor Eles) as Lieutenant Grodin
 Vonetta McGee as "The Negress"
 Anthony Chinn as Kitai
 Niall MacGinnis as "The Erector Set"
 Cyril Shaps as Police Doctor
 John Huston as the Admiral

Production

The film shows its characters speaking Russian without the use of English subtitles by either having the characters speaking Russian while supplying simultaneous voiced-over English translation or else beginning such scenes in Russian and then segueing into English.

The film was planned to be shot over 17 weeks, with 13 weeks at Dino De Laurentiis' studio in Rome, Italy; 2 weeks in Helsinki and one week in both Mexico and New York City. As the producers were not able to film in Moscow, many of the scenes set in Moscow were filmed in the Finnish capital city of Helsinki which features neoclassical buildings similar to those in Leningrad. Filming locations in New York included the Hispanic Society of America, Central Park Zoo and Greenwich Village. Mostly aerial stock footage from the summer of 1969 showing Los Angeles, San Francisco, Chicago and New York City is also seen in the film.

Reaction

Box Office
According to Fox records the film required $10,100,000 in rentals to break even and by 11 December 1970 had made $3,425,000. By September 1970 the studio recorded a loss of $3,939,000 on the film to the studio.

Critical
The film was subject to criticism upon its release.  Vincent Canby of the New York Times called the movie "depressing." Variety had already noted in a pre-release review that The Kremlin Letter "...makes for valuable viewing, but with the piecing together [it is] another thing. Thus is this nastiness of the spy business graphically described. It is an engagingly photographed piece of business." A much later TV Guide review said the film was "Beautifully photographed... [but] a hopelessly convoluted spy drama with so many intricate interweavings that you truly need a scorecard to keep track of the plotters."

Much later, fan-author Jerry Kutner wrote "Among the films of 1970, John Huston's The Kremlin Letter was as unself-consciously noir as his '40s and '50s work."  Craig Butler of Allmovie wrote, "Although it has its partisans, most consider The Kremlin Letter to be a big disappointment... the plot of the novel upon which it is based is simply too dense to be translated to the screen in a film of normal length." Butler went on to note that "Richard Boone really shines, turning in a very fine performance that leaves the rest of the actors in the dust... there are those who will greatly enjoy Kremlin for its twisted plotting and cynicism..."
In 2005, UCLA scholar Bob Hudson noted in the journal Lingua Romana that French filmmaker Jean-Pierre Melville "...used the term magisterial in praise of John Huston's The Kremlin Letter (1970), which he had just viewed the night before the interview. Despite the commercial failure of the film, Melville saw it as establishing the standard for cinema, and explained his quest as an attempt to achieve such grandeur." The Time Out Film Guide calls The Kremlin Letter "powerful... possibly the clearest statement of Huston's vision of a cruel and senseless world in operation."

In 2009, the film was listed in 100 Greatest Spy Movies: A Special Collector's Edition from the Editors of American History [magazine].

See also
 List of American films of 1970

References

External links
 
 
 
 

1970 films
1970s spy thriller films
1970s political thriller films
American political thriller films
American spy thriller films
Cold War spy films
1970s English-language films
1970s German-language films
Films based on American novels
Films based on thriller novels
Films directed by John Huston
Films set in 1969
Films set in 1970
American LGBT-related films
Films shot in Finland
LGBT-related political thriller films
20th Century Fox films
1970 LGBT-related films
Films with screenplays by John Huston
American neo-noir films
1970s American films